The CAFA Championship is an international football competition in Central Asia for the member nations of the Central Asian Football Association (CAFA).

History
The inaugural edition of the senior men's tournament was planned to be hosted by Tashkent in October 2018. It was not played out though. In March 2023, it was announced the inaugural edition of the senior men's tournament would commence in June 2023 in Tashkent and Bishkek for the six member associations, along with the addition of two invited guest teams: Russia and an unconfirmed Asian team.

Format

Results

Senior tournaments

Men's

Women's

U-23 tournaments

Men's
No men's under 23 tournament has been planned yet.

Women's

22.11.2019	Iran 4:0 Tajikistan	Dushanbe Central Stadium

22.11.2019	Uzbekistan	6:0	Kyrgyz Republic Hisor Central Stadium

22.11.2019	Afghanistan	2:1	Turkmenistan Dushanbe Central Stadium

23.11.2019	Tajikistan	0:0	Kyrgyz Republic Dushanbe Central Stadium

23.11.2019	Iran	6:0	Turkmenistan Hisor Central Stadium

23.11.2019	Uzbekistan	10:0	Afghanistan	Dushanbe Central Stadium

25.11.2019	Turkmenistan 0:7	Uzbekistan	Dushanbe Central Stadium

25.11.2019	Tajikistan	5:1	Afghanistan	Hisor Central Stadium

25.11.2019	Kyrgyz Republic	0:6	Iran

26.11.2019	Turkmenistan 0:7	Tajikistan Dushanbe Central Stadium

26.11.2019	Kyrgyz Republic	5:1	Afghanistan	Hisor Central Stadium

26.11.2019	Kyrgyz Republic	0:6	Iran	Dushanbe Central Stadium

28.11.2019	Iran	7:0	Aghanistan	Dushanbe Central Stadium

28.11.2019	Tajikistan	0:3	Uzbekistan	Hisor Central Stadium

28.11.2019	Kyrgyz Republic	0:2	Turkmenistan Dushanbe Central Stadium

See also
Nowruz Cup
AFF Championship
EAFF E-1 Football Championship
SAFF Championship
WAFF Championship
AFC Asian Cup

References

External links
CAFA competitions – official website at the-cafa.com 

 
CAFA competitions